Jake Long (born 3 February 1996) is an Australian rules footballer who formerly played for the Essendon Football Club in the Australian Football League (AFL). He is the son of former Essendon player and Norm Smith Medallist, Michael Long. He was drafted by Essendon with their third selection and forty-seventh overall in the 2015 rookie draft. He made his debut in the six point win against  in round 21, 2016 at Etihad Stadium. He was delisted by Essendon following the 2019 AFL season.

References

External links

1996 births
Living people
Essendon Football Club players
St Mary's Football Club (NTFL) players
Australian rules footballers from the Northern Territory
Indigenous Australian players of Australian rules football
Rioli family